The smoky shrew (Sorex fumeus) is a medium-sized North American shrew found in eastern Canada and the northeastern United States and extends further south along the Appalachian Mountains.

Subspecies
This species has two recognized subspecies:

Sorex fumeus fumeus
Sorex fumeus umbrosus

Description

The smoky shrew is active year-round. It is dull grey in colour with lighter underparts and a long tail which is brown on top and yellowish underneath. During winter, its fur is grey.

Habitat and ecology

This animal is found near streams in cool damp deciduous and mixed woods. It makes extensive, solitary, burrows in the leaf litter on the forest floor or builds globular nests  of plant materials under rocks. The smoky shrew rarely digs tunnels, instead it uses tunnels created by moles or other shrews. Its diet consists mainly of beetles, however other insects, earthworms, snails, small rodents and other soil dwelling invertebrates are also taken. It also consumes plant material to supplement its diet. Predators include owls, snakes, foxes, weasels, and mustelids.

Reproduction
Smoky shrews start mating in late March, and females give birth to their first litters in April or May, about 20 days after mating. They mate again as soon as the first litter is born, and they may have 2 more litters, each about a month apart, if the female lives long enough. Each litter has 2 to 8 pups, usually 6. In one month, the offspring weigh around 4 grams which is half of the adult weight. Male smoky shrews don't take care of their offspring, only the female does. Females make nests in leaf litter where they give birth. The offspring are blind, helpless, and have no fur. Females nurse and protect their offspring for a short time (less than 20 days).

Social behavior

No information exists about the social organization of the smoky shrew. Some field biologists, noting the abundance of the species in some areas and its absence in others, have suggested the smoky shrew is colonial. However, their data remain inconclusive, and may reflect a tendency for smoky shrews to achieve dense populations within pockets of suitable habitat instead of exhibiting a complex social structure

Smoky shrews are quite vocal although the form and function of the vocal repertoire are not well known. Individuals "twitter" while foraging, and give high-pitched grating noises when alarmed.

References

"Smoky Shrew (Sorex Fumeus Miller)." Smoky Shrew. N.p., n.d. Web. 07 Apr. 2015.

Sorex
Mammals described in 1895